Elisa Cusma (born 24 July 1981 in Bologna) is a former Italian middle-distance runner who specialized in the 800 metres.

Biography
She finished seventh at the 2007 World Athletics Final, sixth at the 2008 World Indoor Championships, sixth at the 2008 World Athletics Final and won the bronze medal at the 2009 European Indoor Championships.

She also competed at the 2005 World Championships, the 2006 World Indoor Championships, the 2006 European Championships, the 2007 European Indoor Championships, the 2007 World Championships and the 2008 Olympic Games without reaching the final round.

She finished seventh at the inaugural European Team Championships in 2009, finishing with 2:00.93. She set a personal best time of 1:58.63 at the 2007 World Championships in Osaka. She also has a personal best time of 4:09.34 in the 1500 metres, achieved in June 2007 in Milan. At 2009 World Championships, she finished sixth in the final with 1:58.81.

National titles
Elisa Cusma has won the individual national championship 18 times.
5 wins in the 800 metres (2005, 2006, 2007, 2008, 2009)
3 wins in the 1500 metres (2010, 2011, 2012)
6 wins in the 800 metres indoor (2007, 2008, 2009, 2010, 2012, 2013)
4 wins in the 1500 metres indoor (2006, 2009, 2010, 2012)

See also
Italian all-time top lists - 800 m
Italian all-time top lists - 1500 m

References

External links
 

1981 births
Living people
Italian female middle-distance runners
Athletes (track and field) at the 2008 Summer Olympics
Olympic athletes of Italy
World Athletics Championships athletes for Italy
Athletics competitors of Gruppo Sportivo Esercito
Mediterranean Games gold medalists for Italy
Mediterranean Games medalists in athletics
Athletes (track and field) at the 2009 Mediterranean Games
Sportspeople from Bologna